Dumbrell is a surname. Notable people with the surname include:

George Dumbrell (1906–1990), English footballer
Paul Dumbrell (born 1982), Australian business executive and racing driver
Scott Dumbrell (born 1961), Australian archer
William Dumbrell (1926–2016), Australian biblical scholar